Vice-Admiral Cecil Vivian Usborne, CB, CMG (17 May 1880 – 31 January 1951) was a high-ranking officer in the British Royal Navy. He served as the Director of Naval Intelligence between 1930 and 1932.  His son Henry Usborne was a Member of Parliament 1945–59.

Naval career

Usborne entered the navy as an acting sub-lieutenant. He was confirmed in this rank in July 1899, and promoted to lieutenant in January 1900. He was further promoted to commander in July 1912, and a captain before 1918. He became deputy director of Naval Ordnance in January 1919 and deputy director of Gunnery and Anti-Aircraft Warfare in August 1922.

In April 1928 he was appointed a Naval aide-de-camp to the King and promoted to rear admiral. He served as the Director of Naval Intelligence between 1930 and 1932. Promotion to vice-admiral came in January 1933.

He was brought back into the Navy during the Second World War as Naval Adviser to the First Sea Lord to develop anti-U-boat weapons. As his assistant he employed Edward Terrell who had developed plastic armour.

Usborne was also Captain of the Tactical School, Portsmouth.

Honours
After service during the First World War, he was appointed a Commander of the Greek Order of the Redeemer by Alexander, King of the Hellenes in April 1918, a Companion of the Order of St Michael and St George (CMG) by King George V in June 1918, and an Officer of the French Légion d′honneur in May 1919.
In June 1930 he was appointed a Companion of the Order of the Bath (CB)

References

Bibliography

1880 births
1951 deaths
Royal Navy vice admirals
Directors of Naval Intelligence
Companions of the Order of the Bath
Companions of the Order of St Michael and St George